Leptomesosa is a genus of longhorn beetles of the subfamily Lamiinae, containing the following species:

 Leptomesosa cephalotes (Pic, 1903)
 Leptomesosa langana (Pic, 1917)
 Leptomesosa minor Breuning, 1974

References

Mesosini